Stilbosis tesquella is a moth in the family Cosmopterigidae. It was described by James Brackenridge Clemens in 1860. It is found in North America, where it has been recorded from Arkansas, Colorado, Illinois, Indiana, Iowa, Kansas, Kentucky, Maine, Maryland, Michigan, Minnesota, New Jersey, New York, North Carolina, Ohio, Quebec, Tennessee and West Virginia.

The wingspan is 4–6 mm. The forewings are silvery gray with a purplish-bronze tinge at the base and apex. Adults have been recorded on wing from May to September.

The larvae feed on Amphicarpa bracteata and Lespedeza species.

References

Arctiidae genus list. Butterflies and Moths of the World. Natural History Museum, London.

Moths described in 1860
Chrysopeleiinae
Moths of North America